Solomon Hicks Bethea (May 18, 1852 – August 3, 1909) was an American attorney, politician and judge. He was appointed United States district judge for the Northern District of Illinois by Theodore Roosevelt. He also served as United States Attorney for the same district, was a member of the Illinois House of Representatives for one term, and was Mayor of Dixon, Illinois.

Career
Born in Lee County, Illinois, Bethea read law in 1876.

He was in private practice in Dixon, Illinois, from 1877 to 1898. He was a member of the Illinois House of Representatives from 1882 to 1883 and Mayor of Dixon. He was the United States Attorney for the Northern District of Illinois from 1899 to 1905.

Bethea was nominated by President Theodore Roosevelt on March 18, 1905, to a seat on the United States District Court for the Northern District of Illinois vacated by Judge Christian Cecil Kohlsaat. He was confirmed by the United States Senate on March 18, 1905, and received his commission the same day.

Death
Bethea died on August 3, 1909.

References

Sources
 

1852 births
1909 deaths
People from Dixon, Illinois
Mayors of places in Illinois
Members of the Illinois House of Representatives
Judges of the United States District Court for the Northern District of Illinois
United States Attorneys for the Northern District of Illinois
United States district court judges appointed by Theodore Roosevelt
20th-century American judges
University of Michigan alumni
19th-century American judges